Mandam Aleik is the fifth Arabic language album by Nawal Al Zoghbi, released in 1998 and  produced by Relax-In international.  It was released 1 year after the previous album Habeit Ya Leil and is still considered to be the biggest selling album of Nawal's career.
The album had 3 major hits, the title song plus Ala Bali and Galbi Dag, all of which had video clips and extensive TV promotion.

Track listing

Music videos
 Mandam Aleik (I don't regret on you):
Mandam Aleik shows Nawal trying to escape from the Mafia

 Ala Bali (I want to...):
This music video has Nawal flying to different countries in her bed and seeing things like the Eiffel Tower.

 Galbi Dag (My heart beat):
Nawal was pregnant in this music video so she didn't move at all. The music video was about a party in the jungle in a Spanish style.

References

1998 albums
Arabic-language albums
Nawal Al Zoghbi albums